Mary Leela Rao (born 1940) is an Indian sprint athlete who participated in the 1956 Summer Olympics. She was an Olympic athlete from India. Rao could not complete the qualifying race for the 100 meters, and was eliminated from further competition.

She won a bronze medal in  relay in the 1958 Asian Games.

References

External links 
 
 Official Olympic film documentary  @16:22
 Mary Rao Bio, Stats and Results

1940 births
Living people
Olympic athletes of India
Indian female sprinters
20th-century Indian women
20th-century Indian people
Athletes (track and field) at the 1956 Summer Olympics
Asian Games medalists in athletics (track and field)
Athletes (track and field) at the 1958 Asian Games
Asian Games bronze medalists for India
Medalists at the 1958 Asian Games